Joel Emil Martin Allansson (born 3 November 1992) is a Swedish footballer who plays for Halmstads BK as a midfielder.

Career

Halmstads BK
On 24 December 2018, Halmstads BK announced, that they had signed Allansson on a free agent at the end of the year.

Career statistics

Honours
;IFK Göteborg
Svenska Cupen: 2012–13

References

External links
 
 
 
 

1992 births
Living people
Association football midfielders
Swedish footballers
Sweden international footballers
Sweden youth international footballers
Sweden under-21 international footballers
Swedish expatriate footballers
Allsvenskan players
Division 2 (Swedish football) players
Danish Superliga players
IFK Göteborg players
Randers FC players
Halmstads BK players
Expatriate men's footballers in Denmark